The Kermiscross is a cyclo-cross race held in Ardooie, Belgium usually on a weekday.

Men Palmarès

Women Palmarès

References

 Men's results
 Women's results

Cycle races in Belgium
Cyclo-cross races
Recurring sporting events established in 1995
1995 establishments in Belgium